Gabriel Wallin (born 14 October 1981) is a Swedish athlete specialising in the javelin throw. He represented his country at four World Championships in Athletics without qualifying for the final.

His personal best in the event is 83.23 metres set in Hässelby in 2013.

International competitions

Seasonal bests by year

2004 - 80.71
2005 - 80.31
2007 - 78.97
2008 - 74.62
2009 - 79.69
2010 - 78.31
2011 - 80.88
2012 - 81.45
2013 - 83.23
2014 - 77.88
2015 - 79.16
2016 - 82.81

References

1981 births
Living people
Swedish male javelin throwers
World Athletics Championships athletes for Sweden
People from Södermanland